Marcus Shelby (born February 2, 1966, in Anchorage, Alaska) is an American bass player, composer and educator best known for his major works for jazz orchestra, Port Chicago, Harriet Tubman, Soul of the Movement: Meditations on Dr. Martin Luther King Jr., and Beyond the Blues: A Prison Oratorio. He has led the Marcus Shelby Jazz Orchestra since 2001 and has recorded with artists as diverse as Ledisi and Tom Waits.

He has contributed numerous musical compositions to works created in collaboration with dance ensembles and theater artists ranging from California Shakespeare Theater to Intersection for the Arts.

Background
When Shelby was five, his family moved from Memphis, Tennessee, to Sacramento, California. Shelby played double bass briefly as a teen, but abandoned music until 1988, when he attended a Wynton Marsalis concert with his father, which inspired him to rededicate himself to music.

Shelby moved to Los Angeles and began working with drummer Billy Higgins. After winning the Charles Mingus Scholarship in 1991 he studied music at California Institute of the Arts with Higgins, composer James Newton, and Charlie Haden.

From 1991 to 1996 he recorded and toured with Black/Note (credited as Mark Shelby), a hard bop group based in Los Angeles.

When Black/Note broke up in 1996, he moved to San Francisco because he "had seen groups like Broun Fellinis" whose tenor saxophonist of the time, David Boyce, "was playing a totally different style", and he felt a need to grow. There he founded the Marcus Shelby Trio and the Marcus Shelby Jazz Orchestra. He has served as Artist in Residence at Yerba Buena Gardens Festival and Composer in Residence at Intersection for the Arts.

In 2013, Shelby was appointed to the San Francisco Arts Commission.

Marcus has two daughters.

Major works
 2002: Port Chicago, 14-movement suite for jazz orchestra
 2007: Harriet Tubman, oratorio for voice and jazz orchestra
 2011: Soul of the Movement: Meditations on Dr. Martin Luther King Jr.
 2015: Beyond the Blues: A Prison Oratorio

Discography

With Black/Note
 1991: 43rd & Degnan (World Stage)
 1994: Jungle Music (Columbia / Sony Music Distribution)
 1994: L.A. Underground (RED Distribution)
 1996: Nothin' But the Swing (Impulse! / GRP)

As leader
 1997: Un Faux Pas!, Marcus Shelby Trio (Noir)
 1998: Midtown Sunset, Marcus Shelby and the Jazzantiqua Music Ensemble (Noir)
 1998: Sophisticate, Marcus Shelby Trio (Noir)
 2001: The Lights Suite, Marcus Shelby Jazz Orchestra (Noir)
 2006: Port Chicago, Marcus Shelby Jazz Orchestra (Noir)
 2008: Harriet Tubman, Marcus Shelby Jazz Orchestra (Noir)
 2011: Soul of the Movement: Meditations on Dr. Martin Luther King Jr., Marcus Shelby Jazz Orchestra (Porto Franco)

As sideman/contributor
 1994: Judgement, Robert Stewart
 1996: Flow, Faye Carol
 1998: Mortyfied, New Morty Show
 1998: Intimate Strangers, Marcus Poston
 2004: Too Good to Be True, Buford Powers
 2005: First Pitch Swinging, Danny Grewen
 2006: It's a Good Thing, Jamie Davis
 2006: Blue Divine, Tammy Hall
 2007: The Shotgun Wedding Quintet, The Shotgun Wedding Quintet
 2007: The Code, John Calloway
 2007: 12 Gates to the City, Howard Wiley
 2008: Extraordinary Rendition, Rupa & the April Fishes
 2010: On a Day Like This..., Meklit Hadero
 2011: Bad as Me, Tom Waits

Select collaborations
 1993–2006 Musical Director, Jazz Antiqua Music and Dance Ensemble 
 1998–2004: Savage Jazz Dance Company, Musical Director
 2014: The Legacy of Duke Ellington: 50 Years of Swing! with California Shakespeare Theater
 2015: Notes from the Field: Doing Time in Education, The California Chapter with Anna Deavere Smith

Awards, honors, and commissions
 1991: Charles Mingus Scholarship
 2000: Meet the Composer residency
 2000: Creative Work Fund commission
 2003: Equal Justice Society commission
 2005: Oakland Ballet commission
 2006: Fellow, Resident Dialogues Program of the Committee for Black Performing Arts, Stanford University
 2008: Bay Area Theater Critics Circle Award, Best Original Music Score, Sonny's Blues
 2009: Black Metropolis Research Consortium Fellowship

References

External links
 
 Discography at AllMusic
 All About Jazz profile

1966 births
African-American jazz composers
American jazz composers
African-American jazz musicians
American bandleaders
American jazz double-bassists
Male double-bassists
American session musicians
Composers from San Francisco
Jazz musicians from San Francisco
Living people
Musicians from Anchorage, Alaska
Musicians from Los Angeles
Musicians from Memphis, Tennessee
Musicians from Sacramento, California
Jazz musicians from Tennessee
21st-century double-bassists
21st-century American male musicians
Black Note members
Lavay Smith & Her Red Hot Skillet Lickers members
21st-century African-American musicians
20th-century African-American people